Patton House may refer to:

Sweetwater Mansion, Florence, AL, also known as the Governor Robert Patton House
Dave Patton House, Mobile, AL
Patton House (Wooster, Arkansas)
Woodall-Patton House and Post Office, Ellaville, GA
John Patton Log Cabin, Lexington, IL
Robert Patton House, Covington, KY, listed on the National Register of Historic Places (NRHP)
Virden-Patton House, Jackson, MS
Price-Patton-Pettis House, Shubuta, MS, listed on the NRHP
James "Squire" Patton House, New Windsor, NY
Griffis-Patton House, Mebane, NC
Kerr-Patton House, Thompson, NC
Patton Farm, Phillipsville, NC
Hamilton and Edith Patton House, Medford, OR, listed on the NRHP
John E. Patton House, Coalmont, TN, listed on the NRHP
Patton-Bejach House, Memphis, TN, listed on the NRHP
Augustus B. Patton House, Ogden, UT
Patton Mansion, Charlottesville, VA
Craik-Patton House, Charleston, WV